The Fifth Avenue–59th Street station is a station on the BMT Broadway Line of the New York City Subway. Located under Grand Army Plaza near the intersection of 5th Avenue and 60th Street in Manhattan, it is served by the N train at all times, the W train on weekdays, and the R train at all times except late nights.

Station layout 

The station has two tracks and two side platforms, with a mezzanine above both the western and eastern ends of the station. Replicas of BMT directional mosaics “QUEENS TRAINS” and “BROOKLYN TRAINS” are found on the western exit. Each mezzanine has one stair to each platform.  Mosaics “5”, “Fifth Ave,” and the directional signs on each platform, are fully preserved with new tiles encircling around them.

The station was operated by the BMT until the city government took over the BMT's operations on June 1, 1940. This station was overhauled in the late 1970s. The MTA fixed the station's structure and overall appearance, replacing the original wall tiles, old signs, and incandescent lighting with 1970s modern-look wall tile band and tablet mosaics, signs and fluorescent lights. It also fixed staircases and platform edges. In 2002, the station received a major overhaul. It received state-of-art repairs as well as an upgrade of the station for ADA compliance and restoration the original late 1910s tiling. The MTA repaired the staircases, re-tiling for the walls, installed new tiling on the floors, upgraded the station's lights and the public address system, and installed ADA yellow safety threads along the platform edges, new signs, and new track-beds in both directions.

Artwork here was made in 1997 by Ann Schaumburger and is called Urban Oasis. It uses glass mosaic murals to depict families of different types of animals, particularly for the nearby Central Park Zoo.

Exits
The full-time side of the station at the north end, at 60th Street and Fifth Avenue, has three street staircases, one carved into the outer perimeter of Central Park (northwestern corner of that intersection) and the other two on either eastern corner of the intersection. The part-time side at Central Park South, just by the Plaza Hotel, formerly had a booth (closed in 2003) and three street staircases as well: two carved inside Central Park's perimeter, on the northern side of Central Park South, and one to the southern side, inside a building just west of the Plaza Hotel.

References

External links 
 
 
 Station Reporter — N Train
 Station Reporter — R Train
 MTA's Arts For Transit — 5th Avenue–59th Street (BMT Broadway Line)
 Fifth Avenue and 60th Street entrance from Google Maps Street View
 Central Park South entrance from Google Maps Street View
 Central Park South lobby from Google Maps Street View
 Platforms from Google Maps Street View

Fifth Avenue
BMT Broadway Line stations
New York City Subway stations in Manhattan
Railway stations in the United States opened in 1919
Midtown Manhattan
Upper East Side
Central Park
59th Street (Manhattan)